Glendale National Cemetery is a United States National Cemetery located near the city of Richmond, in Henrico County, Virginia. Administered by the United States Department of Veterans Affairs, it encompasses , and as of the end of 2005 had 2,064 interments. It is closed to new interments.

History 
Glendale National Cemetery was established on May 7, 1866, and named after a farmstead that was on the property at the time. The original interments were the remains of Union soldiers who died at the Battle of Malvern Hill and other nearby American Civil War battlefields.

Glendale National Cemetery was listed on the National Register of Historic Places in 1996.

Notable interments 
 Corporal Michael Fleming Folland (1949–1969), Medal of Honor recipient for action in the Vietnam War.

References

External links 

 National Cemetery Administration
 Glendale National Cemetery
 
 
 

Cemeteries on the National Register of Historic Places in Virginia
National Register of Historic Places in Henrico County, Virginia
Second Empire architecture in Virginia
1866 establishments in Virginia
Protected areas of Henrico County, Virginia
Cemeteries in Richmond, Virginia
United States national cemeteries
Virginia in the American Civil War
Historic American Landscapes Survey in Virginia